Carmel is a hamlet in Ynys Môn, Wales, located 8 miles east of Holyhead and 2 miles south-west of Llannerch-y-medd. It is served by the route 63 bus from Llannerch-y-medd to Bangor.

References

See also 
 List of localities in Wales by population

Villages in Anglesey